Krestenitis (Greek: Κρεστενίτης) is a Greek surname. Notable people with the surname include:

Georgios Krestenitis, Greek politician
Ioannis Krestenitis (elder), revolutionary leader of the Greek War of Independence
Ioannis Krestenitis (younger) (died 1915), Greek politician
Lykourgos Krestenitis (1793–1873), politician and a president of the Parliament of Greece
Stamatis Krestenitis, revolutionary leader of the Greek War of Independence

Greek-language surnames